Hightown is an American crime drama television series that premiered on Starz on May 17, 2020. The series is created by Rebecca Cutter and executive produced by Cutter, Gary Lennon, Jerry Bruckheimer, Jonathan Littman, and KristieAnne Reed and stars Monica Raymund and James Badge Dale. In June 2020, the series was renewed for a second season which premiered on October 17, 2021. In March 2022, the series was renewed for a third season.

Premise
Jackie Quiñones (Monica Raymund) is a National Marine Fisheries Service Agent in Provincetown, Massachusetts who abuses alcohol and drugs. She finds the body of a murdered woman, which launches an investigation by Detectives Alan Saintille (Dohn Norwood) and Ray Abruzzo (James Badge Dale) into Cape Cod organized crime and the local opioid epidemic.

Cast and characters

Main

 Monica Raymund as Jackie Quiñones, a National Marine Fisheries Service Agent in Provincetown, Massachusetts, who is a lesbian, and suffers from alcoholism and drug addiction
 Riley Voelkel as Renee Segna, an exotic dancer at Xavier's Bar and Lounge and the fiancee of Frankie Cuevas Sr.
 Shane Harper as Junior (season 1, guest season 2), a drug dealer and Jackie's friend
 Atkins Estimond as Osito, Frankie Cuevas Sr.'s lieutenant
 Amaury Nolasco as Frankie Cuevas Sr., a drug kingpin who is in jail
 Dohn Norwood as Alan Saintille, a trooper with the Massachusetts State Police assigned to the Cape Cod Interagency Narcotics Unit (CCINU)
 James Badge Dale as Det. Ray Abruzzo, a Massachusetts State Police sergeant also assigned to the CCINU

Recurring

 Rumi C. Jean-Louis as Frankie Cuevas Jr., Renee and Frankie Cuevas Sr.'s son
 Mike Pniewski as Ed Murphy, Jackie's National Marine Fisheries Service partner
 Crystal Lake Evans as Krista Collins
 Ana Nogueira as Donna, Junior's on-and-off girlfriend who has a baby daughter together
 Edmund Donovan as Kizzle
 Gia Crovatin as Devonne Wilson, Jackie's ex-girlfriend
 Masha King as Sherry Henry
 Michael Mulheren as Lt. Velekee, Ray's boss
 Joy Suprano as Patricia
Tonya Glanz as Trooper Leslie Babcock, Ray's old Massachusetts State Police partner whom he had an affair with and Jackie's Massachusetts State Police partner
 Luis Guzmán as Jorge Cuevas (season 2)
 Jona Xiao as Daisy (season 2)
 Charline St. Charles as Henriette (season 2)
 Dominic L. Santana as Chuleta (season 2)
 Crystal Lee Brown as Janelle (season 2)
 Cecil Blutcher as Vernon (season 2)
 Carlos Gomez as Rafael (season 2), Jackie's father
 Barbara Weetman as Callie (season 2), Renee's mother
 Imani Lewis as Charmaine Grasa, niece of drug kingpin Wayne Grasa who takes over his empire after he goes to jail
 Garret Dillahunt as Shane Frawley (season 3)
 Jeanine Serralles as Rachel (season 3) 
 Kaya Rosenthal as Sarah (season 3)
 Michael Drayer as Owen Frawley (season 3)
 Ellie Barone as Veronica (season 3)
 Taja V. Simpson as Janelle (season 3)

Episodes

Series overview

Season 1 (2020)

Season 2 (2021)

Production

Development
By November 27, 2017, Starz had put the production, then titled P-Town, into development. The series was created by Rebecca Cutter, with Gary Lennon as showrunner and both serving executive producers alongside Jerry Bruckheimer, Jonathan Littman, and KristieAnne Reed. Production companies involved with the series were slated to consist of Jerry Bruckheimer Television. By November 26, 2018, Starz had given the production, now titled Hightown, a series order.<ref name="SeriesOrder">{{cite web |last1=Andreeva |first1=Nellie |last2=Petski |first2=Denise |title=Starz Picks Up To Series Strip Club Drama 'P-Valley & Opioid Epidemic Drama 'Hightown' |url=https://deadline.com/2018/11/starz-picks-up-to-series-strip-club-drama-p-valley-opioid-epidemic-drama-hightown-1202508944/ |work=Deadline Hollywood |access-date=January 8, 2019 |date=November 26, 2018 |archive-date=November 17, 2020 |archive-url=https://web.archive.org/web/20201117013916/https://deadline.com/2018/11/starz-picks-up-to-series-strip-club-drama-p-valley-opioid-epidemic-drama-hightown-1202508944/ |url-status=live }}</ref> On February 5, 2019, it was announced that Rachel Morrison would serve as director for the series. On June 11, 2020, Starz renewed the series for a second season. More recently, the creator signed a deal with Lionsgate Television. The second season premiered on October 17, 2021. On March 1, 2022, Starz renewed the series for a third season.

Casting
On September 14, 2018, Monica Raymund had been cast in a leading role in the pilot. On January 9, 2019, James Badge Dale and Riley Voelkel had joined the main cast. In February 2019, Shane Harper, Atkins Estimond, Amaury Nolasco, and Dohn Norwood had been cast in the series in starring roles. On November 19, 2020, Luis Guzmán was cast in a recurring role for the second season. On December 16, 2020, Crystal Lee Brown, Cecil Blutcher, Carlos Gomez, and Barbara Weetman joined the cast in recurring capacities for the second season. On June 15, 2022, Garret Dillahunt, Jeanine Serralles, Kaya Rosenthal, Michael Drayer, Ellie Barone, and Taja V. Simpson were cast in recurring roles for the third season.

Filming
Principal photography for the series was scheduled to commence in March 2019. The Provincetown, Massachusetts, Select Board voted on April 29, 2019, to allow filming from May 20 to June 11 at locations including MacMillan Pier and the harbor, the West End rotary, and Provincetown Inn. Commercial Street between Standish and Ryder streets was scheduled to be closed for part of June 4 in order to recreate a Carnival parade scene. Production for the second season began on November 19, 2020 and concluded on April 2, 2021. Starting in season two the show's production moved to Wilmington, North Carolina.

Reception
Critical response
On Rotten Tomatoes, the series holds an approval rating of 80% based on 20 reviews with an average rating of 6.07/10. The website's critical consensus reads, "Monica Raymund's charms rise above any formulaic tendencies in Hightown'' highly entertaining first season. On Metacritic, the series has a weighted average score of 62 out of 100, based on 8 critics, indicating "generally favorable reviews".

Ratings

Season 1

Season 2

Notes

References

External links
 

2020s American crime drama television series
2020 American television series debuts
2020s American LGBT-related drama television series
English-language television shows
Lesbian-related television shows 
Starz original programming
Television shows set in Massachusetts
Television shows filmed in Massachusetts
Television shows filmed in North Carolina
Television shows filmed in Wilmington, North Carolina
Television series about illegal drug trade